The Barranquilla light rail (Metro ligero de Barranquilla) is a planned light rail line in the Colombian city of Barranquilla.

Background
In November 2018 the Colombian Ministry of Finance and Public Credit approved a public private partnership financing scheme to build a 12 km light rail line following the north-south Calle 30 serving 15 stations and carrying an estimated 101,000 passengers per day.

Route
The line is planned to traverse Calle 30, linking Barranquillita to the Ernesto Cortissoz International Airport in the Soledad municipality. The distance between stations will be around 800 meters.

References

Tram transport in Colombia
Rail transport in Colombia
Proposed rail infrastructure in Colombia